The 2011 Liga Premier is the eighth season of the Liga Premier, the second-tier professional football league in Malaysia.

The season was held from 31 January and concluded on 29 July 2011.

PKNS clinched the 2011 Liga Premier title on 20 May 2011, and first promotion spot to Liga Super, with a 2–0 win over Johor. The win gave them a 12-point unassailable lead over their nearest challenger, Sarawak with 3 games remaining. Sarawak themselves secured the second promotion spot after the 4–1 win over USM on 23 May 2011, gaining an 8-point unassailable difference over nearest rivals Sime Darby with 2 games remaining.

At the other end of the table, 2 Penang teams SDMS Kepala Batas and Penang confirms their status as two last-placed teams in Liga Premier, which relegates them to 2012 Liga FAM competition, subject to confirmation from FAM.

The Liga Premier champions for 2011 season was PKNS. The champions and runners-up were both promoted to 2012 Liga Super.

Teams
A total of twelve teams will contest the league, including eight sides from the 2010 Liga Premier season, two newly promoted teams from 2010 Liga FAM and two relegated teams from the 2010 Liga Super season.

Malacca and Shahzan Muda were relegated from 2010 Liga Premier after finishing the season in the bottom two places of the league table.

2010 Liga FAM champions Sime Darby and runners-up SDMS Kepala Batas secured direct promotion to the Liga Premier.

Team summaries

Stadia

  1 Correct as of end of 2010 Liga Premier season
  2 Sarawak uses the Sarawak State Stadium beginning 14 Feb 2011 due to Sarawak Stadium being renovated for the upcoming Sukma Games in Sarawak.
  + 800 for covered terrace and unknown number for 'open' hill slope

Personnel and kits

Note: Flags indicate national team as has been defined under FIFA eligibility rules. Players and Managers may hold more than one non-FIFA nationality.

  According to current revision of List of Malaysian Liga Premier managers

Nike has produced a new match ball, named the T90 Tracer, which will be electric blue, black and white and also a high-visibility version in yellow. Additionally, Lotto will provide officials with new kits in black, yellow, and red for the season.

League table

Results

Top scorers

Up to matches played on 1 July 2011.

References

External links
Football Association of Malaysia

Malaysia Premier League seasons
2
Malaysia
Malaysia